Women In Product is a 501(c)(3) nonprofit organization "Equip women to thrive in product management careers at all levels." As of 2020, they have communities in 21 regions, including San Francisco Bay Area, Boston, New York City, Austin, Vancouver, and Singapore. They've hosted an annual conference since 2016, the first of which was co-founded by Facebook executives Deb Liu and Fidji Simo, with Sheryl Sandberg as the keynote speaker. In 2020, the organization hosted their fifth annual conference as a virtual event.

References

External links
 
 

Non-profit organizations based in California
Organizations established in 2016
Organizations based in Palo Alto, California
2016 establishments in California